Ayr United Football Club are a football club in Ayr, Scotland, who play in the Scottish Championship, the second tier of the Scottish Professional Football League. Formed in 1910 by the merger of Ayr Parkhouse and Ayr F.C., their nickname is The Honest Men, from a line in the Robert Burns poem "Tam o' Shanter". They play at Somerset Park.

The club is currently managed by Lee Bullen. The club have spent 34 seasons in Scotland's top division, the last being 1977–78, and have been the champions of the second tier of Scottish football on six occasions, and of the third tier on three occasions. The club's most successful manager, Ally MacLeod, went on to manage the Scottish national football team. In 2018, Ayr United secured promotion to the Scottish Championship as champions of League One.

History

Ayr United were founded in 1910 by the merger of Ayr Parkhouse and Ayr F.C. Although Inverness Caledonian Thistle are also the product of a merger between two clubs, Ayr United are the only Scottish Football League club to have been formed from a merger of two existing league clubs.

The club's honours include winning six Second Division titles (as the second tier championship) and a further three titles (as the third tier championship), most recently in 2017–18. They have not won any national cup competitions, although they were runners-up in the 2001–02 Scottish League Cup, and in the Scottish Challenge Cup in the first two seasons in which the competition was held: 1990–91 and 1991–92. They have won the local competition the Ayrshire Cup on 26 occasions, most commonly facing fierce local rivals Kilmarnock in the final. The Ayrshire Cup was last played for in season 1996–97, since when the competition has been suspended.

The club's record scorer in a single season is Jimmy Smith, who scored 66 goals for Ayr in only 38 league matches in 1927–28 and currently holds the British goalscoring record for the most league goals scored in a single season. The club's overall record scorer is Peter Price, who scored 213 times in competitive matches for the club between 1955 and 1962.

Former Scottish national team manager Ally MacLeod is regarded as the club's most famous and most successful manager. He led the club on three separate occasions spanning 15 years, during which his teams recorded a record 214 wins, and won two league titles. In 1973 MacLeod was voted Ayr's Citizen of the Year. More recent managers have also included the recent Scottish national team manager, George Burley, and former Scottish League Cup winner with Raith Rovers, Gordon Dalziel. Gordon Dalziel is the only manager to take Ayr to a National Cup Final on 17 March 2002 when they lost to Rangers 4–0.  Their current manager is Lee Bullen.

Although the club has spent 34 seasons in Scotland's top division, they have played in the second and third tiers of Scottish senior football since the 1977–78 season. During the late 1990s and early 2000s, the club established a record of defeating teams which played in higher leagues in cup competitions, including Hibernian, Dundee, Dundee United, Motherwell, Dunfermline Athletic and four consecutive wins in cup competitions against their fiercest rivals Kilmarnock.

In 1988, Ayr United fan and businessman Sir David Murray offered to buy the club but the club's shareholders rejected the bid by a vote of 60 to 56. The manager at that time, Ally MacLeod, had threatened to leave if Murray's bid had succeeded: Murray went on to become chairman of Rangers, which coincided with a period of financial growth and league success for that club. During much of the 1990s and 2000s, a period of relative success both in league and cup competitions, the Ayr United chairman was local construction magnate Bill Barr. After Barr stood down, there were occasional boardroom struggles: the club suffered significant cashflow problems in 2004 although it survived with a combination of efforts. Prestwick-based Roy Kennedy failed to take over the club in 2005, and his company Kennedy Construction went bankrupt in 2006.

On 24 May 2009, Ayr won the Scottish First Division Play-off against Airdrie United 3–2 on aggregate to win promotion to the First Division. The following season, to celebrate the club's centenary, Ayr United played in black and white hoops, the club's original black and white kit. The away kit was crimson and gold with blue shorts to reflect the original club colours. But it was not a successful season. Ayr were relegated on the last day of the season after losing 2–1 to Morton.
The club bounced back the following season, winning promotion after defeating Forfar Athletic and Brechin City in the play-offs. That same season, they knocked out Hibernian in the Scottish Cup, winning 1–0 at Somerset Park in a replay.

In the 2011–12 season, Ayr enjoyed success in the 2011–12 Scottish League Cup, beating SPL sides Inverness Caledonian Thistle, Heart of Midlothian and St Mirren on their way to the semi-finals. Ayr United played Ayrshire derby rivals Kilmarnock in the semi-finals, the first time the two clubs had met at this stage. Kilmarnock won one-nil. But the league campaign was less successful, as United were relegated to the Second Division following a play-off defeat to Airdrie United.

Following relegation, United announced that Brian Reid's contract would not be renewed. The club appointed Mark Roberts, top scorer in the previous three seasons, manager, with head of youth development, Davie White, as his assistant.
In January 2015, Ian McCall was appointed Ayr's new manager, taking over from Roberts. After saving the club from relegation on the final day of the 2014–15 season, McCall led Ayr back to the Championship with a penalty shoot-out victory over Stranraer in the play-offs. Following their relegation in 2017, Ayr competed in League One but finished the season as Champions, regaining their Championship status at the first time of asking and winning their first league title in over twenty years in the process.

Ayr United enjoyed a good start to the Championship during the 2018–19 season, and found themselves leading the division for part of the season. However, injuries to key players resulted in a dip of form during the second half of the season. This poor form included a shock Scottish Cup defeat to Junior Champions Auchinleck Talbot. Ayr United eventually finish in fourth place, ensuring a place in the playoffs for promotion to the Scottish Premiership. However, they were beaten on aggregate by Inverness Caledonian Thistle.

Key players Lawrence Shankland, Robbie Crawford and Liam Smith departed at the end of 2018–19 and signed for other clubs. Despite these losses, Ayr started the 2019–20 season well and found themselves in 2nd place in September. However, manager Ian McCall departed the club to return to Partick Thistle, ending his 4-and-a-half year tenure. After a recruitment process lasting four weeks, midfielder Mark Kerr was appointed as manager on an 18-month contract.

The 2019–20 season was curtailed due to the Coronavirus pandemic. United were fourth place again at the time of curtailment and this stood as their final league standing. However, the playoffs were not contested due to the pandemic.

The 2020–2021 season was played behind closed doors due to the ongoing pandemic. Ayr United became embroiled in a relegation battle, and manager Mark Kerr was sacked in February 2021. He was replaced by ex-Scotland international and former Greenock Morton, Bradford City and Livingston manager David Hopkin.

Ayr United avoided relegation on the final day of the season after a draw with Inverness Caledonian Thistle.

After a poor start to the 2021–22 season, David Hopkin resigned as manager. Following a spell as caretaker manager, Jim Duffy was appointed as manager on a contract until the end of the season. However, after a poor run of only one win in twelve league games, Duffy was sacked in December 2021.

On 7 January 2022, former Sheffield Wednesday and Dunfermline player Lee Bullen was appointed as Head Coach. Under Bullen's leadership, Ayr United avoided the relegation play-offs and remained in the Championship.

Crest and colours

Crests

From 1948 to 2016, Ayr United used a crest which is a shield containing a Scottish saltire, with a scroll beneath stating the club's name. In 2015, the club became subject to a legal action which claimed that the crest was an unregistered coat of arms. After it had emerged that the club's badge was in jeopardy, a petition was started by fans and gained 700 signatures in 24 hours. The campaign gained support and many political, footballing figures and fans alike lent support to keep the Ayr badge intact. Leader of the Scottish Conservative Party leader Ruth Davidson stated "If archaic rules are forcing the team to change the badge, then I think we need to look at those rules again. When John Scott brought this issue to my attention, I was happy to take it all the way to the UK Government." Another prominent name to join the campaign was former Ayr United and Bayern Munich striker and now a Sky Sports pundit on Soccer Saturday,  Alan McInally, who said "Badges are so important to football supporters and are treasured by everyone. They are worn with pride by grandfathers, dads and sons as they represent the club that they support. New stadiums get built and re-named but the club badge always stays the same”.

In 2016, after a fan competition to design a new club badge, a design incorporating most of the old features of the old badge was introduced.

Colours
The club's original jerseys were red and gold, inherited from Ayr, with navy blue shorts and socks. In 1914, Ayr adopted black and white hoops, which were worn, with several modifications, up to 1930, when The Honest Men switched to a plain white jersey, with navy blue shorts and socks, worn until the outbreak of World War II. After the war, the club retained the white jersey, and switched back to the black shorts that had originally complemented the hooped shirts, kits similar to these were worn up to 1958, when Ayr had changed the black and white look for a white with a blue trim, used until 1963, when they once again reverted to the black and white hoops, that were kept until 1968 and not used again until the 2009–10 centenary season. From then until 1994, Ayr maintained white jerseys trimmed with black with either black or white shorts and socks, then switching to a striped shirt for a single season. The following season, Ayr wore an all-black jersey for the first and only time. Ayr went back to keeping an all-white jersey with either white or black shorts and socks until the centenary season. For the 2011–12 season, a half-black-half-white shirt was worn for the first time, however, Ayr FC had previously wore a similar jersey between 1899 and 1903. The 2013–14 season saw Ayr return to the white jersey, black shorts and socks for the first time since 1973.

Home kits

Away kits

Sponsorship

Stadium

Ayr play their football at Somerset Park in Ayr's New Town. One of the few surviving traditional stadium designs, it consists of one stand, two covered terraces, and one open terrace. The first match to take place at Somerset Park was between the former Ayr and Aston Villa in a 3–0 victory for Ayr.

During the 1990s the club's chairman Bill Barr, who owned and managed a company which built modern-style stadiums and stands for several other clubs around the UK sought — and obtained — planning permission from South Ayrshire Council for a new 10,200 all-seated stadium at Heathfield in Ayr with an associated retail development. The Scottish Executive then "called in" the application and reversed the decision in respect of the retail development. Since the club considered this aspect of the proposal necessary to fund the construction, the development did not proceed.

In November 2006, United signed a contract with Barratt Homes for the sale of Somerset Park, having secured a  site in the Heathfield area of Ayr. The site would house a new £18 million stadium seating 7,650 as part of a "sports and business campus". The project ultimately did not proceed.

First-team squad

On loan

Coaching staff

Managers

Honours

Domestic

League
Scottish second tier (Division Two, Division B, First Division, Championship)
Winners (6): 1911–12, 1912–13, 1927–28, 1936–37, 1958–59, 1965–66
Runners Up (4): 1910–11, 1955–56, 1968–69, 2000–01
Scottish third tier (Second Division, League One)
Winners (3): 1987–88, 1996–97,  2017–18
Runners Up (3): 2008–09, 2010–11, 2015–16
Play-Off Winners (3): 2008–09, 2010–11, 2015–16

Cups
Scottish League Cup
Runners Up (1): 2001–02
Scottish Challenge Cup
Runners Up (2): 1990–91, 1991–92

Regional
Ayrshire Cup
Winners (26): 1911–12, 1925–26, 1928–29, 1932–33, 1935–36, 1937–38, 1938–39, 1949–50, 1957–58, 1958–59, 1960–61, 1964–65, 1968–69, 1969–70, 1970–71, 1974–75, 1975–76, 1976–77, 1977–78, 1979–80, 1985–86, 1987–88, 1988–89, 1990–91, 1994–95, 1996–97
Ayr Charity Cup
Winners (17): 1911–12, 1912–13, 1913–14, 1914–15, 1915–16, 1918–19, 1920–21, 1923–24, 1925–26, 1926–27, 1928–29, 1929–30, 1930–31, 1931–32, 1935–36, 1937–38, 1951–52
Kilmarnock Charity Cup
Winners (4): 1930–31, 1932–33, 1935–36, 1936–37

Records

Club

 Record home attendance
25,225 vs Rangers, 13 September 1969 in Scottish League Division One
 Record attendance in a match involving Ayr United
51,158 vs Rangers, 4 April 1973, Scottish Cup semi-final, at Hampden Park
 Lowest home attendance
106 vs Girvan, 1 May 1991 in the Ayrshire Cup
 Lowest away attendance
192 vs Deveronvale, 28 November 2009, in the Scottish Cup
 Record victory
11–1 vs Dumbarton, 13 August 1952
 Record defeat
0–9 vs Rangers, 16 November 1929 0–9 vs Heart of Midlothian, 28 February 1931 0–9 vs Third Lanark, 4 December 1931

 Record appearances
John Murphy (597 apps), between 1963 and 1978
 Record goalscorer
Peter Price, (213 goals in 251 apps) between 1955 and 1962
 Most Goals in a single season
Jimmy Smith, (66 goals in 38 apps) in the 1927–28 Season
 Most International Appearances (While playing for Ayr)
James Nisbet for Scotland (3) vs Norway, Germany and The Netherlands in 1929
 Youngest player
Mark Shankland, aged 15 years and 300 days (vs Brechin City, 7 May 2011)
 Youngest goalscorer
Alan Forrest, aged 16 years and 321 days (vs Queens Park, 27 July 2013)

Individual
All players are from Scotland unless otherwise stated.

 Top goalscorers

 Most appearances

Hall of Fame

* years involved as a manager
** years involved as vice-chairman

 Scottish Football Hall of Fame

* years involved as manager

 English Football Hall of Fame

International players

Only includes caps won while playing for Ayr United.

  Scotland
 Johnny Crosbie (2 caps, 0 goals) 1919–1920
 Johnny Doyle (1 cap, 0 goals) 1975
 Bob Hepburn (1 cap, 0 goals) 1931
 Jimmy Hogg (1 cap, 0 goals) 1922
 Phillip McCloy (4 caps, 0 goals) 1924–1925
 Jimmy Nisbet (3 caps, 2 goals) 1929
 Jimmy Richardson (2 caps, 0 goals) 1919
 John Smith (1 cap, 0 goals) 1924 

  Faroe Islands
 Jens Kristian Hansen (5 caps, 0 goals) 1999–2000
 Jens Martin Knudsen (3 caps, 0 goals) 1999–2000

References

External links

 
 
 Unofficial Ayr United fans forum
 Ayr United History
 Complete pictorial history of Ayr United playing kit at Historical Football Kits

 
Football clubs in Scotland
Sport in Ayr
Association football clubs established in 1910
1910 establishments in Scotland
Scottish Football League teams
South of Scotland Football League teams
Scottish Professional Football League teams
Football in South Ayrshire